The Protestant church of Deinum or Saint John the Baptist church is a religious building in Deinum, Netherlands, one of the  medieval churches in Friesland. 

It is an early 13th-century building with a tower that dates from 1550-1567. The historic pipe organ was built in 1865 by Willem Hardorff from Leeuwarden. The church was originally a Roman Catholic church dedicated to Saint John the Baptist but became a Protestant church after the protestant reformation. It is listed as a Rijksmonument, number 28586.

References

Churches in Friesland
Rijksmonuments in Friesland
Protestant church of Deinum
Waadhoeke